Pankrushikha is the name of two rural localities in Pankrushikhinsky District of Altai Krai, Russia:
Pankrushikha, Pankrushikhinsky Selsoviet, Pankrushikhinsky District, Altai Krai, a selo in Pankrushikhinsky Selsoviet
Pankrushikha, Zheleznodorozhny Selsoviet, Pankrushikhinsky District, Altai Krai, a station in Zheleznodorozhny Selsoviet

References